Hamilton North and Bellshill was a burgh constituency represented in the House of Commons of the Parliament of the United Kingdom from 1997 to 2005. It elected one Member of Parliament (MP) by the first past the post system of elections.

History 
It was formed by the division of the Hamilton constituency to form Hamilton North and Bellshill and Hamilton South.

Hamilton North and Bellshill was split up in 2005 into parts of Airdrie and Shotts, Coatbridge, Chryston and Bellshill, Lanark and Hamilton East and Motherwell and Wishaw.

Boundaries
The Motherwell District electoral divisions of Bellshill and Tannochside, and North Calder; and the Hamilton District electoral division of Bothwell and Hamilton North.

Members of Parliament

Election results

Elections of the 2000s

Elections of the 1990s

References 

Historic parliamentary constituencies in Scotland (Westminster)
Constituencies of the Parliament of the United Kingdom established in 1997
Constituencies of the Parliament of the United Kingdom disestablished in 2005
Politics of South Lanarkshire
Hamilton, South Lanarkshire
Bellshill